Arbat-e Olya (also Romanized as Arbaţ-e ‘Olyā and Arbaţ ‘Olyā) is a village in Ajorluy-ye Sharqi Rural District, Baruq District, Miandoab County, West Azerbaijan Province, Iran. At the 2006 census, its population was 144, in 25 families.

References 

Populated places in Miandoab County